Macrovipera lebetinus cernovi, known as the Chernov blunt-nosed viper, is a viper subspecies endemic to Asia. Like all other vipers, it is venomous.

Etymology
The subspecific name, cernovi, is in honor of Soviet herpetologist Sergius Aleksandrovich Chernov (1903–1964).

Description
This subspecies normally has semidivided supraoculars.

Geographic range
It is found in northeastern Iran, southern Turkmenistan, and  parts of northern Afghanistan and Pakistan.

References

Further reading
 Chikin Y, Szczerbak NN. 1992. [New subspecies of blunt-nosed viper, Vipera lebetina cernovi, ssp. nov. (Reptilia, Viperidae) from Middle Asia]. Vestn. Zool. (6): 45–49. (in Russian with English Summary).

External links
 

Viperinae
Reptiles of Pakistan